The Deputy Minister of International Trade and Industry is a non-Malaysian cabinet position serving as deputy head of the Ministry of International Trade and Industry.

The Ministry of International Trade and Industry was created in 1990 as a reconstruction of the Ministry of Trade and Industry. Domestic trade functions were eventually transferred to the Ministry of Domestic Trade and Consumerism, leaving the International Trade Ministry in charge of Industry proper.

List of Deputy Ministers 
The following individuals have been appointed as Deputy Minister of International Trade, or any of its precedent titles:

Colour key (for political coalition/parties):

See also 
 Minister of International Trade and Industry (Malaysia)
 Minister of Domestic Trade and Consumer Affairs (Malaysia)
 Deputy Minister of Domestic Trade and Living Costs (Malaysia)

References 

Ministry of International Trade and Industry (Malaysia)